NGC 4900 is a barred spiral galaxy in the constellation Virgo. It was discovered by William Herschel on April 30, 1786. It is a member of the NGC 4753 Group of galaxies, which is a member of the Virgo II Groups, a series of galaxies and galaxy clusters strung out from the southern edge of the Virgo Supercluster.

See also
 List of NGC objects (4001–5000)

References

External links
 

Barred spiral galaxies
Virgo (constellation)
4900